North Prairie is an unincorporated community in Two Rivers Township, Morrison County, Minnesota, United States.  The community is located along Morrison County Road 21 near Gable Road.  Nearby places include Bowlus and Royalton.  The Mississippi River is nearby.

North Prairie was platted in 1885.

References

Unincorporated communities in Morrison County, Minnesota
Unincorporated communities in Minnesota